Vadgaon Sheri  Assembly constituency is one of the 288 Vidhan Sabha (legislative assembly) constituencies of Maharashtra state, western India. This constituency is located in Pune district.

Geographical scope
The constituency comprises ward nos. Ward No. 8 to 15, 64 to 68, 125 to 129 of Pune Municipal Corporation (PMC) and Kalas revenue circle of Haveli taluka excluding areas transferred to PMC.

Members of Legislative Assembly

2019 results

References

Assembly constituencies of Pune district
Assembly constituencies of Maharashtra